Friedrich Wilhelm Konow (11 July 1842, in Mechow – 18 March 1908, in Teschendorf) was a German entomologist who specialised in Hymenoptera especially Tenthredinidae.

Konow was a vicar studying entomology in his spare time.  He wrote Familie Tenthredinidae in Wytsman's, Genera Insectorum ( Fascicle 29) 176 pp. 1905) and very many short papers describing new species of worldwide Tenthredinidae.
His collection is shared between the German Entomological Institute, Biozentrum Grindel und Zoologisches Museum, Hamburg and Museum für Naturkunde  in Berlin

Publications
Konow, 1899. Einige neue Chalastogastra-Gattungen und Arten. - Entomologische Nachrichten 25:73-79

References
Musgrave, A. 1932 Bibliography of Australian Entomology 1775-1930.Sydney

German entomologists
Hymenopterists
1842 births
1908 deaths